Alyn Daniel McCauley (born May 29, 1977) is a Canadian former professional ice hockey player who played in the National Hockey League (NHL) for ten years with the Toronto Maple Leafs, San Jose Sharks, and the Los Angeles Kings. Prior to his NHL career, McCauley was named CHL Player of the Year for 1996–97 while a member of the Ottawa 67's. McCauley was born in Brockville, Ontario, but grew up in Gananoque, Ontario. On February 3, 2022, he was named Director of Player Personnel for the Philadelphia Flyers.

Junior career
McCauley was a junior hockey superstar with the Ontario Hockey League (OHL)'s Ottawa 67's. At the age of 16, McCauley earned a roster spot with the 67's, and enjoyed a highly successful four-year career with the club which culminated with his being named CHL Player of the Year for 1996–97. He was also a First Team All-Star in 1996 and 1997 and represented Canada at the 1996 and 1997 World Junior Ice Hockey Championships, winning gold medals on both occasions. Prior to these two outstanding seasons in Ottawa, McCauley was selected in the fourth round of the 1995 NHL Entry Draft, 79th overall by the New Jersey Devils, though he would never play with the team. Brian Kilrea, the long-time head coach of the 67's, once gave McCauley the ultimate compliment by calling him the best player he had ever coached.

Several concussions almost ended McCauley's promising career before he had ever played a single NHL game, including one which sidelined him for about half of the 1998–99 season.

NHL career
On February 25, 1997, the New Jersey Devils dealt McCauley, along with Jason Smith and Steve Sullivan, to the rebuilding Toronto Maple Leafs in exchange for Doug Gilmour, Dave Ellett, and New Jersey's 3rd round choice in 1999. McCauley was used primarily as a defensive forward in his rookie season in Toronto, and was limited to just six goals and 16 points. Concussion issues continued to plague him as a pro, and these injuries deeply affected his contributions on the ice. By 2000–01, he found himself in the minors with the American Hockey League (AHL)'s St. John's Maple Leafs, though he was called up to Toronto for the playoffs.

By the start of 2001–02, McCauley earned a roster spot in Toronto and was a key contributor for the Maple Leafs all season long, managing to stay injury free. Though no longer the offensive force he had been as a junior player, he had become a solid two-way performer.

On March 5, 2003, Toronto traded McCauley, Brad Boyes, and Toronto's first round choice in 2003 to the San Jose Sharks, with power forward Owen Nolan going to Toronto in exchange. The change of scenery seemed to benefit McCauley. In his first full season with the Sharks in 2003–04, he established career highs in goals (20) and points (47). McCauley was known for his two-way play and his penalty-killing abilities, which earned him a Selke Trophy nomination in 2003–04 as the league's best defensive forward.

After three seasons in San Jose, McCauley signed as a free agent with the division rival Los Angeles Kings in July 2006. He missed the majority of 2006–07 season recovering from a recurring knee injury, and ultimately played in only 10 games in Los Angeles, scoring one goal.

Other
During the 2004–05 NHL lockout, McCauley studied at Athabasca University.

On August 15, 2008, McCauley accepted a position as an assistant coach with the Queen's Golden Gaels men's hockey team.

McCauley has served as a pro scout for the Los Angeles Kings, with whom he received Stanley Cup Rings in 2012 and 2014. From 2018 to 2022, he was  pro scout with the Philadelphia Flyers, and on February 3, 2022, he as named their Director of Player Personnel.

Awards
 OHL First All-Star Team (1996, 1997)
 Red Tilson Trophy (OHL MVP) (1996, 1997)
 CHL First All-Star Team (1997)
 CHL Player of the Year (1997)

Career statistics

Regular season and playoffs

International

References

External links

cnnSI player page

1977 births
Living people
Athabasca University alumni
Canadian ice hockey centres
Canadian people of Scottish descent
Ice hockey people from Ontario
Los Angeles Kings players
Los Angeles Kings scouts
New Jersey Devils draft picks
Ottawa 67's players
Philadelphia Flyers scouts
St. John's Maple Leafs players
San Jose Sharks players
Sportspeople from Brockville
Toronto Maple Leafs players